Binas may refer to:

People
 Alex Binas (born 1990), Greek football player

Places
 Binas, Loir-et-Cher, France

Other
 Binas (book), Dutch science reference work